Synaphea acutiloba, commonly known as granite synaphea, is a shrub endemic to Western Australia.

It blooms between July and November producing yellow flowers.

It is found on rocky hillsides and flats in the Wheatbelt, Peel regions of Western Australia particularly around the Perth Hills area where it grows in sandy-clay-gravelly soils.

References

Eudicots of Western Australia
acutiloba
Endemic flora of Western Australia
Plants described in 1845